Mohamed B. Abdourahman Sadi (born 8 May 1995) is a Libyan basketball player who plays for Al Sadd. He is a member of the Libya men's national basketball team. In 2021, Sadi made his debut in the Basketball Africa League (BAL) with AS Douanes.

Career
Sadi has played for Al Ahli Tripoli and was named the Libya Division 1 Best Player in 2020 and 2021.

Sadi played a short stint with Al-Nasr Benghazi in the 2021 BAL qualifying tournaments, where he averaged 12.3 points and 9.7 rebounds per game. He later joined Senegalese champions AS Douanes on the roster for the 2022 BAL season.

In October 2022, Sadi played for Qatari club Al Sadd.

BAL career statistics

|-
| style="text-align:left;"|2021
| style="text-align:left;"|AS Douanes
| 3 || 0 || 9.7 || .200 || .000 || – || 1.0 || .3 || 1.0 || .0 || 1.3
|-
|- class="sortbottom"
| style="text-align:center;" colspan="2"|Career
| 3 || 0 || 9.7 || .200 || .000 || – || 1.0 || .3 || 1.0 || .0 || 1.3

References

External links
Mohamed Sadi at Proballers

1995 births
Libyan men's basketball players
Shooting guards
AS Douanes basketball players
Living people

Al Sadd Doha basketball players